Leptoconops myanmaricus is an extinct species of biting midges belonging to the family Ceratopogonidae. This species was described from fossilized remains preserved in Burmese amber from the Cenomanian. The amber containing the fossil was mined in the Hukawng Valley, Myanmar.

The species name refers to Myanmar, the name of the country where the amber was found.

References

Prehistoric insects of Asia
†
Insects described in 2004
†
Prehistoric Diptera
Burmese amber